"Show Me"  is a title track of the 1967 album by Joe Tex, who also wrote the song. The single was Joe Tex's  fourteenth release to make the US R&B chart.  "Show Me" went to #24 on the R&B chart and #35 on the Hot 100.

Cover versions
In 1967, Checkmates, Ltd. released a version of the song on their debut album, Live! At Caesar's Palace.
In 1969, Lulu recorded a cover that was included in her Lulu's Album release.
In 1972, Barbara Mandrell recorded the song for her album The Midnight Oil.  Her version peaked at #11 on the Hot Country Singles chart.
In 1976, Eddie and the Hot Rods released a version of the song on their album Teenage Depression.
In 1991, a cover is included in the Alan Parker film The Commitments and released on the film's second soundtrack album, The Commitments, Vol. 2, released in 1992.
Tom Jones performed the song often, and included it on his 1994 album The Lead and How to Swing it.
In 2017, Ronnie Baker Brooks recorded the song. His cover was included on his Times Have Changed release.

References

1967 singles
1967 songs
Joe Tex songs
Checkmates, Ltd. songs
Lulu (singer) songs
Barbara Mandrell songs
Eddie and the Hot Rods songs
Songs written by Joe Tex